Spulerina virgulata is a moth of the family Gracillariidae. It is known from Honshū island of Japan.

The wingspan is 7–9 mm.

The larvae feed on Quercus acutissima, Quercus serrata and Quercus variabilis. They mine the stem of their host plant.

References

Spulerina
Moths of Japan
Moths described in 1988